Saurauia montana is a tropical tree found in Honduras, Costa Rica, and Panama. It grows between 3 and 10 meters tall. The obovate leaves are toothed and can reach 30 cm in length.

The Latin specific epithet montana refers to mountains or coming from mountains.

References

montana
Trees of Costa Rica
Trees of Honduras
Trees of Panama